Pristimantis petersi, also known as Peters's robber frog, is a species of frog in the family Strabomantidae.
It is found in Colombia and Ecuador.
Its natural habitat is subtropical or tropical moist montane forests.
It is threatened by habitat loss.

References

petersi
Amphibians of Colombia
Amphibians of Ecuador
Amphibians of the Andes
Amphibians described in 1991
Taxonomy articles created by Polbot